was a Calvinistic Methodist publication produced in Wales and written in the Welsh language. Although published intermittently before 1830, it became a regular publication in 1831, when preacher John Parry became its editor.

Publication history
 was first published in 1819 as a monthly publication. However, it ceased publication in 1823. It was restarted in 1831 as a quarterly publication, and two of its early editors included Thomas Jones and Thomas Charles, leading figures in the religious and educational development of Wales.

On 26 August 1843, Sir Hugh Owen, wrote in the publication his 'Letter to the Welsh People', regarding the adoption of day schools, which resulted in the appointment of an agent of the British and Foreign Schools Society in North Wales.

The publication ran for over a hundred years, finally folding in 1968.

Bibliography

References

Monthly magazines published in the United Kingdom
Quarterly magazines published in the United Kingdom
Presbyterian Church of Wales
Defunct literary magazines published in the United Kingdom
Magazines disestablished in 1968
Magazines established in 1819
Protestant studies journals
Welsh-language magazines
Literary magazines published in Wales